Alan Tacher Feingold (born 28 March 1971) is a Mexican television host who is part of the main cast of Univision's morning show Despierta América. He is the older brother of actor and television host Mark Tacher.

Television
Califa de Oro (1995)
Te caché (1996-1997)
Chitón (1997-1998)
Tempranito (1998)
 Gente con Chispa (2000-2003)
La Academia (2002-2005)
Aplauso Aplauso (2004)
Levántate (2008)
Décadas (2010)
Hoy (2011-2012)
¡Despierta América! (2012–present)
 Nuestra Belleza Latina 2015 (Celebrity guest; Finale)

References

Mexican television presenters
1971 births
Mexican Jews
Mexican people of Romanian-Jewish descent
Living people